The Federation Cup was an ice hockey cup competition in Ukraine that was contested in 2008 and 2010. It was won by Bilyi Bars Brovary in 2008 and Sokil Kyiv in 2010.

Champions
2008: Bilyi Bars Brovary
2010: Sokil Kyiv

External links 
Ukrainian Ice Hockey Federation

References

Ukra
Ice hockey competitions in Ukraine